Andrew Hartley Delmont (born 16 December 1985 in Adelaide, South Australia) is a professional Australian cricketer who played for South Australia. A right-handed batsman, Delmont was rewarded by South Australia with a rookie contract for the 2007–08 season after playing grade cricket for Adelaide University.

He made his List A debut against Victoria on 19 October 2007. Delmont's first ball was a hat-trick ball by Shane Harwood, yet he successfully defended it and was eventually dismissed for 13. Less than two weeks later, he made his first-class debut against Tasmania at Bellerive Oval. He impressed, scoring 56 in the second innings.

See also
 List of South Australian representative cricketers

References

External links
 Cricinfo profile

Australian cricketers
South Australia cricketers
1985 births
Living people
Cricketers from Adelaide